Ekaterina Alexandrova was the defending champion, but chose not to participate.

Viktória Kužmová won the title, defeating Anna Kalinskaya in the final, 7–5, 6–3.

Seeds

Draw

Finals

Top half

Bottom half

References
Main Draw

Pingshan Open - Singles
Pingshan Open